The Canterbury rugby league team (also known as the Canterbury Bulls) are a rugby league team who represent the Canterbury Rugby League. They currently compete in the Albert Baskerville Trophy. Their home ground is Orangetheory Stadium in Christchurch.

History

Early history

Canterbury played its first match on 7 September 1912 against Wellington at the Show Grounds, losing 4–5. The following weekend the hosted the touring New South Wales side and lost 5–28. Included in the Canterbury team was captain Charlie Pearce, Jim Auld, Abbie Shadbolt, Billy Mitchell, Bill Bussell and David McPhail.

Canterbury's first win was in their third match, against Hawke's Bay, with Canterbury winning 10–8 in Napier. Jim Auld and Abbie Shadbolt scored tries and Shadbolt kicked two goals.

Touring teams
In 1955 Canterbury defeated the touring French side 24–12. They defeated Great Britain 18–10, in 1990.

The 1990s
The early nineties saw a Canterbury side that included many future stars. The side was coached by Frank Endacott and included players such as Quentin Pongia, Terry Hermansson, Mark Nixon, Whetu Taewa Aaron Whittaker, Logan Edwards, Brendon Tuuta and Mike Dorreen. With the creation of the Lion Red Cup however, many moved franchises and eventually ended up in Australia or England. Canterbury defeated Auckland in the 1993 final, winning 36–12.

In the Lion Red Cup, from 1994 to 1996, Canterbury Rugby League was represented by the Christchurch City Shiners and the Canterbury Country Cardinals. When this was folded Canterbury reverted to having one representative team, initially called "the Reds". However eventually "the Bulls" was adopted as a nickname and this was used when the Bartercard Cup was formed.

Bartercard Cup
Between 2000 and 2007 the Bulls played in the now defunct Bartercard Cup. They won two Bartercard Cup trophies, in 2000 and 2003. In addition, they were defeated in the last seconds of the 2004 final. This makes them one of the most successful teams in the competition, alongside the Mt Albert Lions. Out of the seven seasons they only missed the finals once, in 2002.

The Bulls were the only team from the South Island to ever compete in the Bartercard Cup and were the only club to compete in every season. During this time they were coached by Ged Stokes and Phil Prescott.

2006 results

They finished second in the 2006 season standings and defeated the Waitakere Rangers 26–20 in the non-elimination Semi-final. This qualified them for the Qualifying Semi-final which they lost to the Auckland Lions 27–14 at Western Springs Stadium. They bounced back in the preliminary final, smashing the Tamaki Leopards 30–6 but could not defeat the Lions, losing the Grand Final 25–18.

2007 results

Before the start of the 2007 season legendary coach Philip Prescott retired and was replaced by former New Zealand national rugby league team prop Brent Stuart. The Bulls finished the regular season in 3rd place. The highlight of the season was a 72–8 thrashing of the Waicoa Bay Stallions. The Bulls lost the Preliminary Final to Harbour League.

Bartercard Premiership
In 2008 and 2009 they played in the Bartercard Premiership where they made both grand finals. They finished minor premiers both years and defeated Auckland in the 2009 final.

Current
In 2010 the team was replaced in national competitions by one represented the new South Island Zone. Canterbury lost the Rugby League Cup to Auckland on Queen's Birthday 2012, after holding it since 2009.

In 2013 the Canterbury Bulls were added to the Albert Baskerville Trophy, replacing the South Island Scorpions. Until 2016 the Bulls represented the entire South Island and were able to select players from the other South Island districts.

References

External links
 Official Website

New Zealand rugby league teams
Rugby league in Canterbury, New Zealand
1912 establishments in New Zealand